Timothy Andrew Cruz also known as Tim Cruz (born in New York City, New York, USA on 2 January 1979) is an American former pop singer signed with Fearless Management. He is also in music production and does some modelling as well.

In the late 1990s, he was a member of the boy band React with Daniel Matrium. They had a Top 10 hit on the dance charts with "Let's Go All The Way".

In 2001 Tim Cruz became a founding member of another boy band called B3 alongside Rod Michael and John Steven Sutherland. When Rod Michael left, he was replaced in 2002 by Blair Madison Late. B3 was mainly successful in Germany. Their biggest hit was "I.O.I.O.", a cover of a Bee Gees song that was #4 in Germany in 2002 and was in charts in many European and Asian countries (including Austria, Switzerland, Poland, Hungary, the Czech Republic, Thailand).

B3 disbanded in December 2004 and Tim Cruz continued with Fearless Management for a solo career.

He is currently manager of a fitness center in New York City.

Cruz is father of two children.

Discography
Albums with B3: First (February 2002), N.Y.B3 (March 2003), N.Y.B3 Special Edition (November 2003) and Living for the Weekend (September 2004) 
Singles with REACT: "Let's Go All The Way (1998)
Singles with B3: "You Win Again" (2001), "Nightfever" (2002), "I.O.I.O" (2002), "Tonight and Forever" (2002), "You're My Angel" (2003), "We Got the Power" (2003), "All the Girls" (2003), "Move Your Body" (2004) and "Can't Fight the Feeling" (2004)

References

External links
Tim Cruz page on Fearless Management site

1979 births
Living people
American male pop singers
B3 (band) members
Singers from New York City
21st-century American singers
21st-century American male singers